Public Radio East is the National Public Radio member regional network for northeastern North Carolina.  It is a service of Craven Community College in New Bern, with studios in Barker Hall on the college's campus.

The network's original station, WTEB in New Bern, was launched in 1984, on the frequency 89.5, at 66 kW. Later the station moved to 89.3 and increased power to 100 kW. The station has won many awards, including outstanding news operation from the Associated Press.  During the 1990s, it added two full-time stations--WKNS Kinston at 90.3 and WBJD Atlantic Beach (serving Morehead City) at 91.5.  It also added a low-powered translator in Greenville at 88.1, W201AO; the translator is officially a repeater of WTEB.

Originally, all four stations aired a mix of NPR programming and classical music.  In 2003, however, the network split into two separate services.  The original NPR/classical format stayed on WTEB, while the other stations joined with newly signed-on WZNB at 88.5 in New Bern to become the News and Ideas Network, airing an expanded schedule of news and talk programming from NPR and other outlets.  However, the two services simulcast most of NPR's more popular shows, such as Morning Edition and All Things Considered.

On February 5, 2018 the News and Ideas programming moved to WTEB, while WZNB, WKNS, WBJD and W201AO switched to classical as “PRE Classical”.  

As of early 2022, Public Radio East added WHYC Swan Quarter, North Carolina at 88.5, an addition to the PRE Classical stations.

References

External links
 
 
 
 
 

TEB
NPR member stations
Classical music radio stations in the United States
New Bern, North Carolina